Cristopher Aarón Meléndez Suazo (born 25 November 1997) is a Honduran professional footballer who plays as a defender for Motagua.

International career
He made his debut for Honduras national football team on 12 November 2021 in a World Cup qualifier against Panama.

Honours
Honduras Youth
 Pan American Silver Medal: 2019

References

Living people
1997 births
Honduran footballers
Honduras international footballers
People from La Ceiba
Association football defenders
Liga Nacional de Fútbol Profesional de Honduras players
F.C. Motagua players
Footballers at the 2020 Summer Olympics
Olympic footballers of Honduras
Pan American Games medalists in football
Pan American Games silver medalists for Honduras
Medalists at the 2019 Pan American Games
Footballers at the 2019 Pan American Games